The Association of Child Care Officers (ACCO) was the main professional body for social workers looking after the welfare of children in the United Kingdom from 1949 to 1970.

In 1946 the interim report of the Curtis Committee on Children Deprived of a Normal Home Life recommended that training courses for fieldworkers in child care be set up at universities, and four such courses were established. In July 1948 a meeting of students on these courses was called to consider the setting up of a professional association and in November 1949 the Association of Child Care Officers was formed.

In 1970 the association merged with six other social workers' organisations to form the British Association of Social Workers, having been a member of the Standing Conference of Organisations of Social Workers since 1962.

See also
Clare Winnicott

External links
Catalogue of the ACCO archives, held at the Modern Records Centre, University of Warwick

Social work organisations in the United Kingdom
Child welfare in the United Kingdom
Organizations established in 1949
Organizations disestablished in 1970